Misaka Dam is an earthfill dam located in Yamaguchi prefecture in Japan. The dam is used for irrigation. The catchment area of the dam is 2.7 km2. The dam impounds about 13  ha of land when full and can store 1248 thousand cubic meters of water. The construction of the dam was completed in 1923.

References

Dams in Yamaguchi Prefecture
1923 establishments in Japan